Gazzuolo is a comune (municipality) in the Province of Mantua in the Italian region Lombardy, located about  southeast of Milan and about  southwest of Mantua. The town had been a possession of Gonzaga family, the lord of Mantua, from the late Middle Ages, and John Hawkwood, a famous English mercenary captain in 14th-century Italy, was once the lord of this town in 1370s'-80s'.

Gazzuolo borders the following municipalities: Commessaggio, Marcaria, San Martino dall'Argine, Spineda, Viadana.

Main sights
Gonzaga porticoes
Palazzo Gonzaga
Church of Maria Nascente (17th century)
Church of St. Roch
Oratory of San Pietro al Belforte (10th century)

References

Cities and towns in Lombardy